"The Bazaar" is a song by Canadian rock band The Tea Party. It was released as a promotional single in Australia, Canada, the Netherlands, and the USA. The music video was shot in Istanbul, and its Grand Bazaar. An acoustic version was recorded also and released on Alhambra as "The Grand Bazaar".

"The Bazaar" is a standard three-piece rock song with an introduction composed of harmonium and goblet drums. Jeff Burrows described the song as fusing "the exotic with heavier rock side of the band better than any other song".

The song has been covered by the symphonic metal band Hollenthon as a bonus track on their 2008 album, Opus Magnum.

Track listing 
"The Bazaar"

References

External links
 The music video

1995 singles
The Tea Party songs
Song recordings produced by Ed Stasium
1995 songs
EMI Records singles